The Windward Islands consists of various islands located in the Caribbean Sea such as Dominica, Martinique, Barbados, Saint Lucia, Saint Vincent and the Grenadines, Trinidad and Tobago, and Grenada. It consists of various cultures, beliefs and languages.

Language emergence 
Since the 16th and 17th centuries, the Windward Islands have developed a variety of different verbal languages that consists of many unofficial (indigenous) languages and official languages. Many communities within the region have combined these languages and have created their own. The Windward Islands similarly contain a wide variety of indigenous or Creole signed languages. Creole languages are a set of languages that are categorized under their own rights. Creole is derived from Pidgin, a very simple language used between individuals that do not share a common language.  

In communities with high rates of deafness, there are rural/village sign languages which are shared languages that are used by the deaf and hearing in a region of congenital deafness which can be called rural sign languages, shared languages, or micro-community sign languages. In the second type, which is called Deaf community sign languages, there are institutional or macro-community sign languages. In the second type of language, deaf children come together through the establishment of a deaf education system. Also, new sign languages have been introduced due to the creation of deaf schools in the 20th century. Due to the lack of resources in the Windward Islands, many deaf individuals lack knowledge or have communication delays. Many people create their own forms of communication, leading to various forms of sign languages in the Windward Islands that have not yet been identified by linguists.

Trinidad and Tobago 
Trinidad and Tobago uses Trinidad and Tobago Language (TTSL) which is the region's indigenous deaf sign language. This language originated around 1943 when the first deaf school opened, called the Cascade School for the Deaf. TTSL is not taught in deaf education in Trinidad and Tobago, but it is mixed with American Sign Language in Deaf associations. Many young individuals in Trinidad and Tobago, however, do not use TTSL very often because of ASL learning at school.

Saint Vincent and the Grenadines 
In Saint Vincent and the Grenadines, rural deaf populations and micro-community sign languages are common. In this area of the Windward Islands, the indigenous sign language is unknown, but the most commonly used sign language is American Sign Language (ASL) or Signing Exact English (SEE-II). In addition, deaf or hard-of-hearing individuals over the age of 35 in Saint Vincent use sign languages because sign language was not recently introduced in this area. Many deaf individuals rely on family home signs to communicate and older deaf individuals do not communicate or interact with the national deaf community. These individuals are more isolated in rural areas and they often do not have access to deaf education or a developed sign language. According to SIL International, "Although deaf people indicated that there may be a few local signs and facial expressions confined to St. Vincent, they all indicated that they have grown up using 'Sign America' that they learned at school and that there is no 'St. Vincent Sign Language."

Martinique 
In Martinique, the main language is French and this area is governed by France. Due to this, the main language or most used sign is French Sign Language or LSF. According to the Society for Caribbean Linguistics (SCL), Martinique did not have a deaf school, meaning many individuals had to go to school in France and come back to work. However, the Martinique individuals did not like this since the French and Martinique cultures are so different. The Martinique deaf individuals are now working together to expand their own versions of sign languages to incorporate their own culture.

Dominica 
In Dominica, the most common sign language used is American Sign Language (ASL). The other sign languages used are unknown or are unofficial.

Barbados 
In Barbados, deaf and hard-of-hearing individuals use American Sign Language (ASL) with a combination of signs that represent Bajan dialect and culture. Other sign languages are unknown, but it is common for deaf individuals to have village sign languages.

Saint Lucia 
Saint Lucia's most common use of sign language is American Sign Language (ASL). The other sign languages used are unknown or are unofficial.

Grenada 
Due to the first Grenadian deaf school (built in 1969), ASL or American Sign Language was introduced and is now commonly used throughout Grenada. After a Canadian woman started teaching in the school and left, the education system continued to teach students more ASL signs. In Grenada, deaf people over the age of 40 are reported to use only home signs and gestures. Deaf or hard-of-hearing individuals under the age of 40 know and use ASL due to the education and spread of the Canadian woman's use of ASL. Before this introduction to ASL, there were no indigenous Grenadian sign languages.

Empowerment and charity 

The Windward Islands has many organizations that help deaf individuals and the hearing impaired such as The Starkey Hearing Foundation,  SIL International, The Joshua Project, Caribbean Deaf News, and the National Emergency Management Organization.

Caribbean Deaf News 
The Caribbean Deaf News includes many social media account such as Facebook, YouTube, and Instagram which creates awareness throughout the region of the Caribbean of news of the deaf. The social media accounts lets individuals know of current events, weather warnings, and education to provides more opportunities for those who are deaf throughout the region.

The Joshua Project 
The Joshua Project is a research initiative that contributes to find highlights of ethnic people groups of the world and to implement church-planting movements. The Joshua project has created awareness throughout the region of the Windward Islands. In Saint Lucia, it provides information such as how many deaf individuals are currently living there, the languages, ministries and prayer points for the deaf/hard of hearing.

The Starkey Foundation in Grenada 
The Starkey Hearing Foundation works to provide education, service delivery, and global advocacy for those who are deaf or hard of hearing. The Starkey Foundation is growing in the area of Grenada. In October 2019, the foundation held the first hearing mission in Grenada. The foundation served over 250 patients and provided than 540 hearing aids to Grenadians. The foundation also established the WFA Community-Based Hearing Healthcare Program which delivers direct access to hearing healthcare services. The foundation announced the need for more awareness throughout the region and collaborated with many ministries to build a sustainable model that helps Grenadians who need hearing aids but cannot afford them.

Organizations in Trinidad and Tobago 
One significant organization is the Trinidad and Tobago Association for the Hearing Impaired. This association was founded in 1943 and targets to provide better quality of life for those who are deaf, hard of hearing, late deafened and families of such. The association was brought about to help with the growing number of children being diagnosed with deafness die to the outbreak of German measles rubella virus. The association provides support for parents and families. In addition, the Trinidad & Tobago Association for the Hearing Impaired provides many services like testing, hearing aid fitting, specialty clinics, and also helps to aid and amplify its services. The association helps many individuals across the region and provides testing for hearing loss for children which helps to prevent improper education for the future of the children in the regions of Trinidad and Tobago. SIL International is an organization that is revealing, researching, and helping those who may lack ways of communication. The research the organization has done states, "According to our deaf questionnaire participants, Trinidad does not currently have any deaf associations, organizations, or clubs. Although they did at one time exist, they have closed due to lack of membership." The membership diminishing was due to the cost of travel to meet at a certain location and other personal reasons. The SIL International discusses the Trinidad and Tobago Association for the Hearing Impaired (TTAHI). The organization discusses to the TTAHI is responsible for addressing issues like deaf equality, educational needs, employment, and other social services. However, many individuals in the region were not aware that TTAHI even existed.

SIL International in Saint Vincent and the Grenadines, Martinique, and Domenica 
The SIL International research states data from Saint Vincent. The data states, "There is only one known deaf person in St. Vincent over the age of 35 and very few younger deaf people have been identified. No known genetic deafness or families with multiple deaf members were found or reported. There are no associations, organizations, or clubs for or led by the deaf community in St. Vincent." However, some deaf individuals were reported that they meet downtown in Saint Vincent on weekends and early evenings, but are not considered organizations and they only continuous meeting locations are at religious services.

In Martinique, the deaf population varies between 400 and 3,200 out of 402,000 people. According to SIL International, Martinique has four known deaf associations: "Deaf World Tourism", in Pour L'Education et L'Insertion Des Sourds (AMEIS) is a regional organization of parents of deaf children in Martinique. The organization works toward a social and professional implementation for deaf adults in their region to provide education in French Sign Language (LSF). Surdus Antilles in Fort-de-France gives training specifically in sign-language education and offers educational courses in French Sign Language. In fact, in 2007, five individuals received interpreter certificates from this program using French Sign Language (LSF).

In Dominica, the deaf population varies between 75 and 320 out of 73,000 people. According to SIL International, the establishment of the Dominica Association of Disables Persons (DADP) was established in 1983 and its work was "to unite all forms of disability in a common struggle for 'full participation' and 'equality' with and among its fellow citizens" The association is funded by grants, donations, special events, and an annual government subvention and has well over 400 members included to help. The association helps to raise public awareness, provide deaf individuals skills to those in need who need employment and communication through Braille, sign language, and amateur radio. The DADP also grasps local and overseas medical treatment, trains in independent living, and other important life skills.

Organizations in Barbados 
The Barbados Association for the Blind and Deaf is a registered Charity association and was established by the Act of Parliament in 1957. According to the SIL International, "in the first year of its founding, the association started the first school for deaf students." The school primarily focused on deaf education and the population of the school kept increasing and the school changed its name to Irving Wilson School for the Blind and Deaf which is currently the only educational institution for deaf students in Barbados. The Joshua Project is another huge organization that provides information for each island located in the Windward Islands. The Joshua Project is a Christian organization that coordinates with other works of missionary organizations to track and care for those in need. The project gathers data and information to share and encourage church-planting movements among the least reached groups of individuals of different regions of the world.

Civil rights 
The rights of citizens of the Windward Islands vary throughout the region. According to the Initial Report on the United Nations Convention on the Rights of Persons with Disabilities, "The purpose of the Convention is to promote, protect and enable the full and equal enjoyment of all human rights and fundamental freedoms by all persons with disabilities (PWDs), and to promote respect for their inherent dignity." The following areas of the Windward Islands were involved in the signing go the Convention on the Rights of Persons with Disabilities: Dominica (March 30, 2007), Grenada (July 12, 2010), and St. Lucia (September 22, 2011). In St. Vincent and the Grenadines (October 10, 2010), Dominica (October 1, 2012), Grenada (August 27, 2014), Trinidad and Tobago (June 25, 2015), and Saint Lucia (June 11, 2020) fall under the Accession (a)/Ratification of the Convention on the Rights of Persons with Disabilities (CRPD). St. Vincent and the Grenadines (October 10, 2010), Dominica (October 1, 2012), and Saint Lucia (June 11, 2020) officially completed the ratification of the Optional Protocol (OP) to the CRPD.

Trinidad and Tobago 
On September 27, 2006, the Government of the Republic of Trinidad and Tobago (GORTT) signed the Convention on the Rights of Persons with Disabilities.

Dominica 
According to SIL International, Domica was one of the first countries to sign the United Nations Convention on the Rights of Persons with Disabilities. However, their disabled individuals are still marginalized. In fact, females are experiencing the worst marginalization. The Dominica Protection of Employment Act guarantees disabled women the right to work, however, there is very few ways of training or education to prepare them for employment.

Early hearing detection and screening 
Early Hearing detection and interventions are not commonly used throughout the Windward Islands. EHDI is a program that helps to ensure that newborns, infants, and young children who are hard of hearing or deaf are diagnosed early to receive the care they need in the future. Newborn hearing screening in the overall Caribbean region is difficult to obtain due to the high rates of acquired congenital loss and the cost. Access to education and proper school systems in the Caribbean, and more specifically the Windward Islands, is very low. In addition, entry into higher education for the children and the number of deaf professionals and academics continue to stay very low also. Many deaf people do not have any type of education because they are kept home by their parents to help with at-home tasks. According to The Journal of Early Hearing Detection and Intervention, a study was done in 2020 to detect the prevalence of early screening and the following regions lack or do not have enough data to report on early hearing detection and screening: Grenada, Dominica, Saint Lucia, Saint Vincent and the Grenadines.

Trinidad and Tobago 
In Trinidad and Tobago, the Language Education Policy stated that at no time in the history of education in the country has there been sufficient information on deafness and deaf education for a policy position to be arrived at.  According to the Speech, Language, and Audiology Association of Trinidad and Tobago, there is currently no comprehensive pediatric audiology services offered in Trinidad and Tobago's publish health sector. There are very few audiologists that are in practice. However, parents can send their child to pursue a hearing evaluation if they are concerned with their child's hearing. The results of a diagnostic test could do the following: reveal normal hearing in both ears which may contribute to a speech or language delay and make sure there is a presence of hearing loss in one or both ears (mild, moderate, severe, profound). In addition, if hearing loss is detected, the family will be notified and will be counseled on how hearing loss can influence a child's communication, literacy and social skills, and his/her academics. Also, recommendations are often made for the best type of hearing technology that accommodates the age and degree of hearing loss.

Early intervention 
Similarly to the hearing detection, in the Windward Islands and many parts of the Caribbean, children struggle to receive access to cochlear implants, hearing aids and other helpful resources that they individuals need. In fact, the World Health Organization indicates that over 5% of the world's population has disabling hearing loss and Latin America and the Caribbean account for 9% of the global burden of disabling hearing loss. However, many organizations such as the Starkey Foundation, state sources of locations where hearing technology can be accessed in each area in the Windward Islands. Although the children and parents have access to small organizations to receive the technology that is needed, it is difficult to keep up with the use and issues that may come with the technology. In addition, very few audiologists are located in the Windward Island region, but if they are accessed, they will provide children hearing aids, cochlear implants, and provide customized fitting of appropriate technology.

Language deprivation 
Language deprivation prevents many individuals and children from fully obtaining the skills that are required to succeed in society and school environments. The Windward Islands lacks collected data and information to declare the statement of official language deprivation in the region. According to the Bernard van Leer Foundation, the region has "little monitoring of what happens at the country’s pre-school centres. The stress tends to be on custodial care or on subjects that might give a child a head start in mainstream schooling. Research in both countries has shown that softer skills such as communication, creativity and language are rarely stressed in pre-school provision." It is difficult to declare if the region that consists of the Windward Islands is officially deprived of language, but may be assumed to some individuals due to the lack of data and research.

Barbados and Trinidad and Tobago 
The Irving Wilson School for the Blind and Deaf is currently the only educational institution for deaf students in Barbados, although eight other primary schools around the country also offer special-education services in special classroom units where some deaf students may attend. Many deaf adults in the islands felt that more effort and work needed to be done to make sure that deaf children have early access to signed language. In fact, a deaf teaching assistant in Trinidad and Tobago described an example of the kinds of problems he had observed in his years of teaching. One student the teacher had said that he only started school aged 12 and had no access to a signing model his whole life. From this, the student arrived at the deaf school being very delayed in communication and had to be taught the basics of sign from scratch. This issue is very common and is faced by many individuals in the Windward Islands. Due to this issue in the Windward Islands, deaf children do not receive many opportunities and lack support in their region. In the islands, many ministries and non-provide organizations help those in need but many deaf children are not able to attend school due to the lack of interpreters, educators, and other resources to provide proper education. In addition, there are very few places to access hearing technologies and to access them many people need to travel great distances to receive them or to have them repaired. Many deaf individuals prefer and state that it is easier to not have cochlear implants or hearing technologies due to the cost, time, and inconvenience. This is a huge issue in the Windward Islands and not much research has been done to discover the island's deaf education level and not many individuals have had the opportunity to obtain the proper education or resources for communication.

Primary and secondary education 
In the Caribbean region and the Windward Islands there is very little research on linguistic access in deaf education has taken place when compared to other regions around the world. This region has struggled and continues to fail involving successful access to progress deaf children a proper school education such as primary, secondary, and especially high education. the region lacks deaf professionals and academics to contribute to the development of deaf education.

Trinidad and Tobago 
In Trinidad and Tobago, deaf education is an understudied area. Trinidad and Tobago's Language and Language Education Policy comments that "at no time in history of education in the country has there ben sufficient information of deafness and Deaf Education."  In Trinidad and Tobago, the beginnings of deaf education began around 1931, where there were about 74 deaf people in Trinidad and Tobago. The first school for deaf children was opened on November 15, 1943, and has slightly expanded since then. Trinidad and Tobago contains no deaf preschools or high schools. According to Deafness and Education International, "the only designated schools for deaf students are the following three primary schools: Cascade School for the deaf, Audrey Jeffers' School for the dead, and the Tobago School for the Deaf, Speech and Language Impaired. In addition, according to an ethnographic study from Trinidad and Tobago, "in the Caribbean there has been a failure of the education system to prepare deaf students for successful entry into higher education and the number of deaf professionals and academics remains low." Approximately 5% of deaf children in the country have deaf parents to provide them with accessible first language at home and most Trinbagonians who are deaf or hard-of-hearing have hearing parents and have no access to a native signing model. Due to this delay of communication, deaf Trinbagonians suffer educational delays and to learn a sign language, they must start at primary school. 

A 2021 study investigated how an emergent system of e-learning that began during the COVID-19 crisis conditions and how it has impacted the linguistic access and education of deaf students in Trinidad and Tobago. This study involves the learning system, course materials and the language/communication that took place within the deaf primary and secondary students, their teachers, interpreters, and parents. The study showed that many of the deaf students in both the primary and secondary school encountered many communication barriers that caused issues in education due to many issues such as lack to internet/poor connection and that the country was not prepare to convey the full range of communication available in sign language. Many students faced struggles to decode the English language text and the written language is usually inaccessible to the students. This issue is stripping the primary and secondary deaf students of proper education and is delaying their education even further. In addition to the lack of secondary and primary schools, according to The Caribbean Educational Research Journal, many deaf people reported that they felt isolated when they were places in a mainstream school with little or no deaf peers at all. many deaf individuals stated that they would rather attends a special secondary school for deaf students.

Barbados 
In Barbados, there are many similarities to Trinidad and Tobago as well as many other areas in the Windward Islands. In Barbados, many deaf individuals achieve very low levels of education in secondary schools because too may children enter the secondary school with inadequate numeracy skills and literacy and do not have enough qualifications.  Compared to other countries, the prevalence of speech and hearing problems in government primary schools in Barbados appears to be higher. One in four children in Barbados has either speech or hearing difficulties, causing many deaf Barbadians to perform poorly or not succeed in secondary schools.

The one school deaf or hard-of-hearing Barbadians attend is The Irving Wilson School. The school caters to children ages 5–18 years old and the Incorporation of American Sign Language (ASL), Braille, and large print in included in the academic program. The Irving Wilson school for the Blind and deaf is currently the only educational institution for deaf students in Barbados. However, according to SIL International,  there are eight other primary schools around the country that offer special-education services where deaf Barbadian students may attend. These education services are the Ann Hill School in St. Michael Parish that offers secondary educational options to others with disabilities, however, there has not been any mentions that deaf students attend this certain school.

Higher education 
According to The Caribbean Educational Research Journal, the capability of Deaf professionals and academics to contribute to the development of Deaf education has remained very low which leads to deaf students for successful entry into higher education remains very low. Many deaf individuals in the Windward Islands have the opportunity to enter into any education centers at all due to their parents not being able to afford the education or keeping them at home for at-home tasks. In addition, in most of the region, many deaf individuals do not have the education to progress or the education has been so delayed that they cannot go much further. Many wish to progress to higher education but are unable or incapable of doing so.

Trinidad and Tobago 

In Trinidad and Tobago, many deaf people want to pursue and go to the next level of higher education at local universities and secondary schools, but most of the deaf population do not progress due to the lack of interpreting services and/or classroom support. Most deaf individuals do not have any type of education, in fact, due to many parents keeping them at home to help with tasks at home. According to the SIL International, the at-home tasks are called "slave labor" by the deaf informants from the study the organization performed. These situations come up because the parents of the deaf children are afraid that others will discover they have a deaf child, they cannot afford to send their child to school, live too far away from a proper school, or cannot or want their child to have an independent life because of work around the house.

Grenada 
There are only two schools in the country for deaf students. Due to this, many deaf people in Grenada cannot obtain higher education there and wish to gain higher education in the United States. However, it is rare for a deaf individual to pass a high school entrance exam. Individuals passing the entrance exam are allowed to attend high school or further education, according to SIL International.

Employment 
Many deaf individuals in the Windward Islands obtain jobs that include at-home tasks, sewing, factories, and other jobs that do not require higher education. It is very common for them to have the same job as hearing individuals but receive less pay due to being hard of hearing or deaf. Many individuals face the fear of not having a job altogether if they complain.

Barbados 
Unemployment in Barbados is a serious issue. The president of a New Life deaf Club stated that "Presently, these people still find it difficult to gain meaningful employment and, when they do, they are often paid less than other workers. some employers even deny them the right to be employed, on seeing their application forms, only because of their disability."

Grenada 
Deaf individuals in Grenada generally work in factories, technological jobs, sewing, cleaning, or in family businesses. Deaf individuals state that the pay is not equivalent as for hearing people and they also do not have the education needed for a better paying job.

St. Vincent 
Saint Vincent contains a very small deaf population and every known deaf individual in the community of Saint Vincent has a job, but it is not high-paying due to lack of education.

Saint Lucia 
Children that are faced with deaf or hard of hearing aspects are faced with barriers in education which further effects the employment rates for deaf or hard of hearing individuals in Saint Lucia. There are very few employment opportunities for adults  and there are few employment opportunities for adults.

Trinidad and Tobago 
Employment rates for the deaf individuals in Trinidad and Tobago seem to be very low, according to SIL International. Many DHH individuals in Trinidad and Tobago claim that they did not receive adequate education to progress or obtain jobs. The jobs that many of deaf Trinidadians would receive are either ones that are limited to the skills they have learned through vocational training. Such training involved the following: carpentry, cleaning houses, fixing furniture, cooking, factory jobs and more hands-on jobs. Very few deaf individuals in Trinidad and Tobago work in an office or educational contexts and most state that they could not discover any type of steady employment. Many participants in a deaf questionnaire indicate that they viewed a better education as a main way to defeat the employment struggle and to create a more independent lifestyle. In addition, when deaf individuals find employment in Trinidad and Tobago, they usually receive less financial compensation than hearing people doing the same job. However, many individuals do not complain about the inequity due to the fear of losing their job all together.

Healthcare 
The Windward Islands has various health locations and emergency medical services such as Windward Islands Emergency Medical Services (WIEMS) However, many parts of the region lack the healthcare needed to have a healthy future for deaf or hard of hearing individuals. Many individuals have difficulty communicating with their healthcare provider, leading to more health issues. . DHH individuals are more vulnerable to the contraction of STIs and HIV due to communication barriers and misinformation.

In Trinidad and Tobago, a social development ministry has recently partnered with DRETCHI/TTAHI which is the only organization that provides hearing health care facilities at minimum or no cost to the population. Both of the agencies collaborated with the Starkey Hearing Foundation to donate hearing aids.

Grenada 
Grenada has one of the best healthcare systems in the Caribbean. It provides primary care to the citizens free-of-charge, but people who live outside of Grenada may find the level of care to be lower than what they are used to. The healthcare system is run by the Ministry of Health (MOH). The MOH steers policy and finance decisions for the country's thirty-six public health facilities, according to the International Student Insurance. The facilities are evenly spread through the country so every household is within three miles of a healthcare provider. However, deaf Grenadians still often find themselves struggling and finding an interpreter to properly communicate medical information. Many doctors and healthcare providers are not equipped and unprepared for deaf or hard of hearing individuals. It is common that many deaf individuals find themselves lost and without any help.

Language preservation and revitalization 
In general, sign languages are vulnerable since they cannon by written down in some cases and the communities of deaf or heard-of-hearing individuals are most often relatively small. In the Caribbean and Windward Island region, the use of American Sign Language has been on the rise and the use of other Creole and indigenous sign languages have been decreasing. However, the effort to keep these indigenous sign languages alive continues in some areas of the Windward Islands today, and are still continuing to be used.

Trinidad and Tobago 
Since the 1950s when TTSL or Trinidadian Sign language was emerged, technology has expanded the use of the unique sign. Technology has made it more available to deaf individuals to watch videos of other sign languages around the world and spread the use and educate others how to communicate using TTSL. According to the University of the West Indies, there is a danger that TTSL could disappear similarly to how the verbal indigenous languages have disappeared in recent years. There is of changing currents in educational policy in Trinidad and Tobago, today. For example, according to The Caribbean Educational Research Journal, "there is a sharp difference between the TTSL created and used by Deaf Trinbagonians who went to school before 11975, and the predominance of ASL among younger signers." This issue is creating language barriers throughout the county and is also creating isolation from the older deaf individuals from the younger population. The move towards mainstreaming of deaf children in Trinidad and Tobago has also contributed to the loss of the use of TTSL. TSSL, in the past, was transmitted across generations by the presence of older TTSL signers, but presently many young children have little or no contact with the older deaf signers.

The President of the Deaf Empowerment Organization of Trinidad and Tobago discusses a view that most deaf Trinbagonians express: "some people think that it doesn't matter if TTSL disappears but it is very precious and it needs to be preserved and continued. Many missionaries have come from America bringing ASL and it has put pressure on TTSL, but we should not let is disappear." Trinidadian Sign language is of very high importance to the deaf individuals in Trinidad and Tobago due to the fact that it is the primary language of hundreds of deaf Trinbagonians and is a source of pride and expression of cultural identity. In fact, The Deaf Organization of Trinidad and Tobago has grown apart from the Government-funded project to produce a dictionary of Trinidadian sign Language. TTSL is very essential to many individuals in Trinidad and Tobago and strikes interest in academics since it is very uncommon to have the ability to identify the origins of a language, especially a signed language. The University of the West Indies that is located in St. Augustine, Trinidad, continues to contribute and promote the use of TTSL. In fact the university has 'hosted two symposia on sign language and deaf culture in Trinidad and Tobago and provided the venue for only the second TTSL class ever to be offered.

Saint Vincent 
According to SIL International, DHH people have not recorded or identified any local signs in St. Vincent but do have access to some ASL dictionaries that have come from the United States. These dictionaries, however are usually used by hearing people to learn vocabulary for American Sign Language and deaf people often do not use them. The Saint Vincent deaf population is very small and the only known data is shown that children are only learning American Sign Language. In addition, churches and casual deaf meetings are reported and have been viewed to use ASL. Due to the small size of the deaf population in Saint Vincent, the use of American Sign Language and lack of indigenous sign language before ASL, it is most likely that deaf individuals in Saint Vincent will continue to use ASL in all aspect of life.

Grenada 
In Grenada, deaf individuals state that they all sign the same kind of ASL besides for three deaf groups such as the older induction generation who did not learn sign language and communicate through common gestures, deaf people who were educated orally and never tried sign language and isolated dead individuals who use their own home sign. According to SIL International, few deaf schools have access to ASL materials in dictionary form, not video. However, there was a Grenadian signs book with line drawing that was published through the deaf school in Grenada, but there is only a few paper copies still in existence and there are no digital copies of it. Due to the lack of any developed sign language other than ASL in Grenada, there is not much preservation or revitalization of any other signed language besides ASL.

References

Wikipedia Student Program
Windward Islands
Deafness